In basketball, an assist is a pass to a teammate that directly leads to a score by field goal. The National Collegiate Athletic Association's (NCAA) Division I (D-I) assist title is awarded to the player with the highest assists per game average in a given season. While the NCAA began sponsoring women's sports in the 1981–82 season, well after the NCAA established its current three-division alignment for competitive and governance purposes, it did not officially record assists until the 1984–85 season.

Suzie McConnell of Penn State holds the all-time D-I record for single-season assists per game (11.8), which she accomplished in 1986–87. She also recorded 355 assists that season, which is the second-highest single-season mark behind Gonzaga's Courtney Vandersloot, who recorded 367 in 2010–11 while playing 6 more games than McConnell did in 1986–87. The first woman to lead D-I in scoring and assists in the same season was Caitlin Clark for Iowa in 2021–22.

Eight players have earned multiple assist titles. La’Terrica Dobin of Northwestern State is the only one to have earned three titles, doing so from 2002–2004. Six others have earned the honor in consecutive seasons: McConnell (1986, 1987), Neacole Hall of Alabama State (1988, 1989), Andrea Nagy of FIU (1994, 1995), Dalma Iványi of FIU (1998, 1999), Vandersloot (2010, 2011), and Niya Johnson of Baylor (2015, 2016). The other player with two assists titles is Tiana Mangakahia of Syracuse, who won titles in 2017 and 2021, the latter after returning from breast cancer treatment.

Only two freshmen (Tine Freil and Michelle Burden) and five sophomores (McConnell, Dobin, Claire Faucher, Mangakahia, and Clark) have led Division I in average assists. Four players born outside the United States have led Division I in assists — Freil, born in Denmark; Nagy and Iványi, both born in Hungary; and Mangakahia, born in Australia.

Key

Assists leaders

Schools are indicated with their current athletic brand names, which do not always match those used by a team in the relevant season.

Footnotes

References
General

Specific

NCAA Division I women's basketball statistical leaders